Ringvoll is a village in the municipality of Hobøl, Norway. Its population (2005) is 473.

It is around 15 km north of Moss and 45 km south of Oslo.

Villages in Østfold